Grigaičiai is a village in Vilnius District Municipality, Lithuania, just south of Naujoji Vilnia. According to the 2011 census, it had population of 1,325.

References

Villages in Vilnius County
Vilnius District Municipality